Wasdale (traditionally ) is a valley and civil parish in the western part of the Lake District National Park in Cumbria, England. The River Irt flows through the valley to its estuary at Ravenglass. A large part of the main valley floor is occupied by Wastwater, the deepest lake in England. The population of Wasdale was only minimal and, from the 2011 Census is included in the parish of Gosforth.

Geographical features

On the south-eastern side of the lake are very steep screes below the summits of Whin Rigg and Illgill Head which are more accessible on the far side. The head of the valley is dominated by the Great Gable and Scafell Pike, the highest peak in England, which, along with Scafell, Kirk Fell and Yewbarrow, surround the small community of Wasdale Head. Wasdale is famous amongst rock climbers as the home of British rock climbing. A classic route is Nape's Needle on Great Gable.

Settlements
At the hamlet of Wasdale Head is St Olaf's Church, one of the smallest churches in England.

Further down the valley are the villages of Strands and Gosforth.

Fells
Clockwise from the north-west:-

Seatallan
Buckbarrow
Middle Fell
Yewbarrow
Red Pike
Scoat Fell
Pillar
Kirk Fell
Great Gable
Sty Head Pass
Great End
Scafell Pike
Lingmell
Scafell
Illgill Head
Whin Rigg
Irton Pike

Etymology
The name came from Old Norse Vatnsdalr = "valley of the water".
The alternative spelling "Wastdale" existed through much of the nineteenth century.

Gallery

See also

Listed buildings in Wasdale

References

External links

 Cumbria County History Trust: Eskdale and Wasdale (nb: provisional research only – see Talk page)
 Cumbria County History Trust: Nether Wasdale (nb: provisional research only – see Talk page)
 Wasdale website
 Photos of Wasdale

Valleys of Cumbria
Civil parishes in Cumbria
Borough of Copeland